Vasyl Yaroslavovych Kardash (born 14 January 1973) is a football defender from Ukraine.

Career
Kardash played 14 games for the Ukraine national football team.

References

External links
 
 
 

1973 births
Living people
Sportspeople from Lviv
Soviet footballers
Ukrainian footballers
Ukraine international footballers
Ukraine under-21 international footballers
Association football defenders
FC Karpaty Lviv players
FC Skala Stryi (1911) players
Maccabi Haifa F.C. players
FC Chornomorets Odesa players
FC Dynamo Kyiv players
FC Dynamo-2 Kyiv players
FC Dynamo-3 Kyiv players
FC Arsenal Kyiv players
FC Hoverla Uzhhorod players
FC Irpin Horenychi players
Soviet Second League players
Soviet Second League B players
Ukrainian Premier League players
Ukrainian First League players
Ukrainian Second League players
Ukrainian Amateur Football Championship players
Liga Leumit players
Ukrainian expatriate footballers
Expatriate footballers in Israel
Ukrainian expatriate sportspeople in Israel
Ukrainian football managers